"The TNT Punch" is a Sailor Steve Costigan short story by Robert E. Howard.  It was originally published in the January 1931 issue of Action Stories.  It has been reprinted under the titles "The Waterfront Law" and "The Waterfront Wallop" since Howard's death.  The story was sold to Action Stories publisher Fiction House in August 1930 for $75.

The story concerns Costigan entering into a grudge match in South Africa in order to raise bail money for another boxer.  Like all of the Sailor Steve Costigan stories it is told in the first person by Costigan himself.

Plot

The story starts with Steve Costigan and his dog Mike ashore in Cape Town, South Africa, and penniless after having to pay a fine for Mike biting a policeman.
He meets an old enemy, Shifty Kerren, who is the manager of rival boxer Kid Delrano.  Kerren says Delrano is in jail and needs to pay the £6 ($30) fine to be released.  When he plays on Costigan's sense of patriotism, he agrees to get him the money for his release.

Costigan heads to the waterfront and the South African Sports Arena.  Promoter "Bulawayo" Hurley set him up in a special grudge match with the Australian sailor/boxer Bucko Brent.  Bucko was the brutal mate aboard the Elinor when Costigan served on her on the way to Bristol to meet the Sea Girl.  They fought a few says into the trip and Bucko ended up with several broken bones.

A few rounds into the fight, with Bucko almost unconscious, Bucko and crew from the Elinor soak his left glove in Turpentine.  A blow from this to the face blinds Costigan but not before he can grab Bucko's wrist and force the glove into his own face.  Things get worse when the referee gets involved and, being blinded, Bucko punches and blinds him as well.

Soon, however, Costigan manages to catch hold of Bucko, knocks him out and wins the £6 prize money.  The fight took longer than expected so Costigan takes the money directly to Shifty Kerren's room only to find Kid Delrano already there.  The Kid laughs at Costigan, having bet Shifty $10 that they "could hand you a hard luck tale and gyp you outa your last cent".  Costigan soon knocks out the Kid, his sparring partner Bill Slane and Shifty then leaves.

On his way back, he finds a young woman being thrown out by her landlady.  Costigan uses the prize money to pay her rent and feels proud to have contributed to a worthy cause and for being too smart to be conned out of the money.  However, back at the American Sailors Bar, the bar man mentions the notorious con artist "Boardin'-house Kate" is in town, taking money by pretending to being thrown out by her landlady.  With his final coin, he ends the story by asking the barman, "Give me a schooner of beer and take this nickel, quick, before somebody comes along and gets it away from me."

Publication history

"The TNT Punch" was first published in the January 1931 issue of the pulp magazine Action Stories.  Since that time it has been reprinted in these publications:

 Fight Stories, Fall, 1941, retitled as "The Waterfront Wallop" and attributed to the housename "Mark Adam"
 The Howard Review #4, 1975
 REH Fight Magazine #2, September 1990, retitled again as "Waterfront Law"
 The Complete Action Stories, November 2001
 The Complete Action Stories, November 2003
 The Complete Action Stories, January 2005
 Boxing Stories, April 2005, using the "Waterfront Law" title

The story is now in the public domain.

References

External links

 List of stories and publication details at Howard Works

Short stories by Robert E. Howard
Pulp stories
1931 short stories
Short stories about boxing
Works originally published in Action Stories